Midlands 4 West (North) is a level 9 English Rugby Union league and level 4 of the Midlands League, made up of teams from the northern part of the West Midlands region including Shropshire, Staffordshire, parts of Birmingham and the West Midlands and occasionally Cheshire, with home and away matches played throughout the season.  Each year some of the clubs in this division also take part in the RFU Junior Vase - a level 9-12 national competition. 

Formed for the 2005-06 season, the division was originally known as Midlands 5 West (North) but changed to its present name for the 2008–09 season due to league restructuring.  Promoted teams tend to move up to Midlands 3 West (North) while since the dissolution of Midlands 5 West (North) at the end of the 2018-19 season relegated teams drop to Midlands 5 West (South).

2021–22

Participating teams & locations

Cannock who finished 12th in 2019-20 were relegated to Midlands 5 West (South) with their place taken by Oswestry who were level transferred from Lancs/Cheshire 2 which was disbanded before the start of the 2021-22 season.

2020–21
Due to the COVID-19 pandemic, the 2020–21 season was cancelled.

2019–20

Participating teams & locations

2018–19

Participating teams & locations

2017–18

Participating teams & locations

Teams 2016-17
Aston Old Edwardians 
Barton-Under-Needwood 
Bishops Castle & Onny Valley 
Bloxwich (relegated from Midlands 3 West (North))
Church Stretton 
Essington (promoted from Midlands 5 West (North))
Five Way Old Edwardians
Rugeley  
St Leonards (promoted from Midlands 5 West (North))
Trentham
Wednesbury (relegated from Midlands 3 West (North))
Yardley & District

Teams 2015-16
Aldridge (promoted from Midlands 5 West (North))
Aston Old Edwardians (relegated from Midlands 3 West (North))
Barton-Under-Needwood 
Bishops Castle & Onny Valley 
Bromyard
Church Stretton (promoted from Midlands 5 West (North))
Market Drayton 
Rugeley 
Telford Hornets 
Uttoxeter (relegated from Midlands 3 West (North))
Yardley & District

Teams 2014-15
Barton-Under-Needwood (transferred from Midlands 4 West (South))
Bishops Castle & Onny Valley 
Bromyard	
Cannock	
Cleobury Mortimer
Greyhound 
Market Drayton (relegated from Midlands 3 West (North))
Rugeley (promoted from Midlands 5 West (North))
Telford Hornets (promoted from Midlands 5 West (North))
Tenbury	
Yardley & District (relegated from Midlands 3 West (North))

Teams 2013-14
Bishops Castle & Onny Valley
Bromyard
Cannock
Clee Hill
Cleobury Mortimer (relegated from Midlands 3 West (North))
Five Ways Old Edwardians
Greyhound
Harborne
St Leonards (promoted from Midlands 5 West (North))
Tenbury
Warley (promoted from Midlands 5 West (North))

Teams 2012–13
Barton-Under-Needwood
Bishops Castle & Onny Valley
Bromyard
Cannock
Clee Hill
Five Ways O.E.
Harborne
Market Drayton	
Telford Hornets
Tenbury
Uttoxeter

Teams 2008–09
Bishops Castle & Onny Valley
Burntwood  
Cleobury Mortimer
Handsworth
Leek
Moseley Oak
Newcastle 
Old Yardleians
Shrewsbury
Tamworth
Veseyans
Willenhall

Teams 2007–08
Bishops Castle & Onny Valley
Bournville
Burntwood  
Harborne
Old Halesonians
Old Yardleians 
Moseley Oak
Tamworth
Telford Hornets
Veseyans
Willenhall

Original teams

When this division was introduced in 2005 as Midlands 5 West (North), it contained the following teams:

Bloxwich - transferred from North Midlands (North) (4th)
Bournville - transferred from North Midlands (North) (9th)
Cannock - transferred from Staffordshire 1 (champions)
Essington - transferred from North Midlands (North) (7th)
Five Ways Old Edwardians - transferred from North Midlands (North) (6th)
Old Griffinians - transferred from North Midlands (North) (3rd)
Selly Oak - relegated from Midlands 4 West (North) (9th)
Warley -transferred from North Midlands (North) (5th)
Yardley & District - relegated from Midlands 4 West (North) (10th)

Midlands 4 West (North) honours

Midlands 5 West (North) (2005–2009)

Midlands 5 West (North) was introduced ahead of the 2005–06 season as a tier 9 league to replace the discontinued North Midlands (North) and Staffordshire 1 leagues.  Promotion was to Midlands 4 West (North) and relegation to Midlands 6 West (North).

Midlands 4 West (North) (2009–present)

Further league restructuring by the RFU meant that Midlands 5 West (North) and Midlands 5 West (South) were renamed as Midlands 4 West (North) and Midlands 4 West (South), with both leagues remaining at tier 9.  Promotion was now to Midlands 3 West (North) (formerly Midlands 4 West (North)) and relegation to Midlands 5 West (North) (formerly Midlands 6 West (North)) until that league was discontinued at the end of the 2018–19 season.

Number of league titles

Eccleshall (2)
Harborne (2)
Bloxwich (1)
Bournville (1)
Clee Hill (1)
Cleobury Mortimer (1)
Edwardians (1)
Handsworth (1)
Linley (1)
Market Drayton (1)
Old Griffinians (1)
Trentham (1)
Uttoxeter (1)

Notes

See also
Midlands RFU
North Midlands RFU
Staffordshire RU
English rugby union system
Rugby union in England

References

9
5